The Primetime Emmy Award for Outstanding Variety Series is a category in the Primetime Emmy Awards. It is awarded annually to the best variety show or similarly formatted program of the year. The award is sometimes known by other names, such as “Outstanding Comedy-Variety or Music Program” and “Outstanding Variety, Music, or Comedy Series.”

History
From 1979 to 1989 and in 1991, variety series and specials competed together. Single programs dominated as winners during this time until the Outstanding Variety Special category was formed. Since 1994, all of the winners in this category have been late-night talk shows, except in 1997.

The Daily Show with Jon Stewart won the award for ten years consecutively (2003–2012), the longest winning streak for a television show in Primetime Emmy Award history. In 2015, this category was separated into two categories – Outstanding Variety Sketch Series and Outstanding Talk Series.

Winners and nominations

1950s

1960s

1970s

1980s
{| class="wikitable" style="width:100%"
|- bgcolor="#bebebe"
! width="5%" | Year
! width="20%" | Program
! width="70%" | Producers
! width="5%" | Network
|-
! colspan="4" | Outstanding Variety, Music or Comedy Program
|-
| rowspan=6" style="text-align:center" | 1980(32nd)
|- style="background:#FAEB86"
| Baryshnikov on Broadway
| Herman Krawitz (executive producer), Gary Smith (producer), Dwight Hemion (producer), Mikhail Baryshnikov (star)
| ABC
|-
| The Benny Hill Show
| Philip Jones (executive producer), Keith Beckett (producer), David Bell (producer), Ronald Fouracre (producer), Peter Frazer-Jones (producer), Dennis Kirkland (producer), John Robins (producer), Mark Stuart (producer), Benny Hill (star)
| rowspan=2| Syndicated
|-
| The Muppet Show
| David Lazer (executive producer), Jim Henson (producer/performer), Dave Goelz (performer), Louise Gold (performer), Richard Hunt (performer), Kathryn Mullen (performer), Jerry Nelson (performer), Frank Oz (performer), Steve Whitmire (performer)
|-
| Goldie and Liza Together
| George Schlatter (executive producer), Don Mischer (producer), Fred Ebb (producer), Goldie Hawn (star), Liza Minnelli (star)
| rowspan=2| CBS
|-
| Shirley MacLaine... 'Every Little Movement'''
| Gary Smith (producer), Dwight Hemion (producer), Shirley MacLaine (star)
|-
| rowspan=6" style="text-align:center" | 1981(33rd)
|- style="background:#FAEB86"
| Lily: Sold Out| Lily Tomlin (executive producer/star), Jane Wagner (executive producer), Rocco Urbisci (producer)
| CBS
|-
| The Benny Hill Show| John Robins (producer), Dennis Kirkland (producer), Mark Stuart (producer), Keith Beckett (producer), Benny Hill (star)
| rowspan=2| Syndicated
|-
| The Muppet Show| David Lazer (executive producer), Jim Henson (producer/performer), Frank Oz (performer), Jerry Nelson (performer), Richard Hunt (performer), Dave Goelz (performer), Louise Gold (performer), Steve Whitmire (performer), Kathryn Mullen (performer), Brian Muehl (performer), Karen Prell (performer)
|-
| The Tonight Show Starring Johnny Carson| Frederick De Cordova (producer), Peter Lassally (co-producer), Johnny Carson (star)
| NBC
|-
| AFI Life Achievement Award: A Tribute to Fred Astaire| George Stevens Jr. (producer)
| CBS
|-
| rowspan=6" style="text-align:center" | 1982(34th)
|- style="background:#FAEB86"
| Night of 100 Stars| Alexander H. Cohen (executive producer), Hildy Parks (producer), Roy A. Somlyo (co-producer)
| ABC
|-
| Ain't Misbehavin'| Alvin Cooperman (producer/executive producer), Buddy Bregman (producer)
| NBC
|-
| AFI Life Achievement Award:A Tribute to Frank Capra| George Stevens Jr. (producer)
| rowspan=2| CBS
|-
| Baryshnikov in Hollywood| Herman Krawitz (executive producer), Don Mischer (producer), Mikhail Baryshnikov (star)
|-
| SCTV Network| Andrew Alexander (executive producer), Doug Holtby (executive producer), Len Stuart (executive producer), Jack E. Rhodes (executive producer), Patrick Whitley (supervising producer), Barry Sand (producer), Don Novello (producer), Nic Wry (co-producer)
| NBC
|-
| rowspan=6" style="text-align:center" | 1983(35th)
|- style="background:#FAEB86"
| Motown 25: Yesterday, Today, Forever| Suzanne De Passe (executive producer), Don Mischer (producer), Buz Kohan (producer), Suzanne Coston (producer for Motown)
| NBC
|-
| The 37th Annual Tony Awards| Alexander H. Cohen (executive producer), Hildy Parks (producer), Roy A. Somlyo (co-producer)
| rowspan=2| CBS
|-
| The Kennedy Center Honors: A Celebration of the Performing Arts| George Stevens Jr., Nick Vanoff (producer)
|-
| SCTV Network| Andrew Alexander (senior executive producer/executive producer), Len Stuart (executive producer), Jack E. Rhodes (executive producer), Doug Holtby (executive producer), Patrick Whitley (supervising producer/producer), Nancy Geller (producer), Don Novello (producer)
| rowspan=2| NBC
|-
| The Tonight Show Starring Johnny Carson| Frederick De Cordova (producer), Peter Lassally (co-producer), Johnny Carson (host)
|-
| rowspan=6" style="text-align:center" | 1984(36th)
|- style="background:#FAEB86"
| The Kennedy Center Honors: A Celebration of the Performing Arts| Nick Vanoff (producer), George Stevens Jr.
| CBS
|-
| Late Night with David Letterman| Jack Rollins (executive producer), Barry Sand (producer), David Letterman (host)
| rowspan=2| NBC
|-
| The Tonight Show Starring Johnny Carson| Frederick De Cordova (executive producer), Peter Lassally (producer), Johnny Carson (host)
|-
| The 38th Annual Tony Awards| Alexander H. Cohen (executive producer), Hildy Parks (producer), Martha Mason (co-producer)
| rowspan=2| CBS
|-
| AFI Life Achievement Award:A Tribute to Lillian Gish| George Stevens Jr.
|-
| rowspan=6" style="text-align:center" | 1985(37th)
|- style="background:#FAEB86"
| Motown Returns to the Apollo| Suzanne De Passe (executive producer), Don Mischer, Suzanne Coston (co-producer), Michael Weisbarth (co-producer)
| NBC
|-
| Great Performances| Robert Manby (executive producer), Diane M. Gioia (supervising producer), Sherman Sneed (producer), Bill Siegler (coordinating producer), Lena Horne (star)
| PBS
|-
| Late Night with David Letterman| Jack Rollins (executive producer), Barry Sand (producer), David Letterman (host)
| NBC
|-
| AFI Life Achievement Award: A Tribute to Gene Kelly| George Stevens Jr. (producer)
| CBS
|-
| The Tonight Show Starring Johnny Carson| Frederick De Cordova (executive producer), Peter Lassally (producer), Johnny Carson (host)
| NBC
|-
| rowspan=6" style="text-align:center" | 1986(38th)
|- style="background:#FAEB86"
| The Kennedy Center Honors: A Celebration of the Performing Arts| Nick Vanoff (producer), George Stevens Jr.
| CBS
|-
| Late Night with David Letterman| Jack Rollins (executive producer), Barry Sand (producer), David Letterman (host)
| rowspan=2| NBC
|-
| The Tonight Show Starring Johnny Carson| Frederick De Cordova (executive producer), Peter Lassally (producer), Johnny Carson (host)
|-
| The 40th Annual Tony Awards| Alexander H. Cohen (executive producer), Hildy Parks (producer), Martha Mason (co-producer)
| CBS
|-
| AFI Life Achievement Award: A Tribute to Billy Wilder| George Stevens Jr.
| NBC
|-
| rowspan=6" style="text-align:center" | 1987(39th)
|- style="background:#FAEB86"
| The 41st Annual Tony Awards| Don Mischer (executive producer), David J. Goldberg (producer)
| CBS
|-
| Late Night with David Letterman| Jack Rollins (executive producer), David Letterman (executive producer/host), Barry Sand (producer)
| rowspan=2| NBC
|-
| The Tonight Show Starring Johnny Carson| Frederick De Cordova (executive producer), Peter Lassally (producer), Johnny Carson (host)
|-
| The Tracey Ullman Show| James L. Brooks (executive producer), Jerry Belson (executive producer), Ken Estin (executive producer), Heide Perlman (executive producer), Richard Sakai (producer), Paul Flaherty (co-producer), Dick Blasucci (co-producer), Tracey Ullman (host)
| Fox
|-
| Liberty Weekend| David L. Wolper (executive producer), Don Mischer (producer)
| ABC
|-
| rowspan=6" style="text-align:center" | 1988(40th)
|- style="background:#FAEB86"
| Irving Berlin's 100th Birthday Celebration| Don Mischer (executive producer), Jan Cornell (producer), David J. Goldberg (producer), Sara Lukinson (co-producer)
| CBS
|-
| Late Night with David Letterman| Jack Rollins (executive producer), David Letterman (executive producer/host), Robert Morton (producer)
| rowspan=2| NBC
|-
| Late Night with David Letterman (6th Anniversary Special)| Jack Rollins (executive producer), David Letterman (executive producer/host), Robert Morton (producer)
|-
| The Smothers Brothers Comedy Hour| Tom Smothers (executive producer/host), Ken Kragen (producer), Dick Smothers (host)
| CBS
|-
| The Tracey Ullman Show| James L. Brooks (executive producer), Heide Perlman (executive producer), Jerry Belson (executive producer), Ken Estin (executive producer), Richard Sakai (producer), Ted Bessell (producer), Marc Flanagan (co-producer), Tracey Ullman (host), Dick Blasucci (co-producer)
| Fox
|-
| rowspan=6" style="text-align:center" | 1989(41st)
|- style="background:#FAEB86"
| The Tracey Ullman Show| James L. Brooks (executive producer), Jerry Belson (executive producer), Heide Perlman (executive producer), Ken Estin (executive producer), Sam Simon (executive producer), Richard Sakai (producer), Ted Bessell (producer), Marc Flanagan (co-producer), Tracey Ullman (host)
| Fox
|-
| The Arsenio Hall Show| Arsenio Hall (executive producer/host), Marla Kell Brown (producer)
| Syndicated
|-
| Late Night with David Letterman| Jack Rollins (executive producer), David Letterman (executive producer/host), Robert Morton (producer)
| rowspan=2| NBC
|-
| Saturday Night Live| Lorne Michaels (executive producer), James Downey (producer)
|-
| Tap Dance in America(Great Performances)
| Don Mischer (executive producer), Jac Venza (executive producer), David J. Goldberg (producer), Rhoda Grauer (producer), Gregory Hines (performer)
| PBS
|}

1990s

2000s

2010s

Programs with multiple awards
Totals include wins for Outstanding Talk Series and Outstanding Scripted Variety Series.

11 awards
 The Daily Show with Jon Stewart7 awards
 Last Week Tonight with John Oliver6 awards
 Late Show with David Letterman Saturday Night Live3 awards
 The Andy Williams Show The Carol Burnett Show2 awards
 The Colbert Report The David Frost Show The Dinah Shore Chevy Show Kennedy Center Honors Rowan & Martin's Laugh-In The Tonight Show Starring Johnny Carson Your Show of ShowsPrograms with multiple nominations
Totals include nominations for Outstanding Talk Series and Outstanding Scripted Variety Series.

27 nominations
 Saturday Night Live17 nominations
 Late Show with David Letterman15 nominations
 The Daily Show with Jon Stewart The Tonight Show Starring Johnny Carson12 nominations
 Real Time with Bill Maher11 nominations
 The Carol Burnett Show Jimmy Kimmel Live! Late Night with David Letterman10 nominations
 The Colbert Report The Tonight Show with Jay Leno8 nominations
 Last Week Tonight with John Oliver Politically Incorrect7 nominations
 Dennis Miller Live6 nominations
 Drunk History The Late Show with Stephen Colbert5 nominations
 AFI Life Achievement Award The Daily Show with Trevor Noah The Dean Martin Show The Dick Cavett Show The Garry Moore Show Late Night with Conan O'Brien MTV Unplugged The Muppet Show The Perry Como Show Your Show of Shows4 nominations
 The Andy Williams Show The Ed Sullivan Show Full Frontal with Samantha Bee The Jackie Gleason Show Kennedy Center Honors The Late Late Show with James Corden Portlandia Rowan & Martin's Laugh-In The Smothers Brothers Comedy Hour Tony Awards The Tracey Ullman Show3 nominations
 A Black Lady Sketch Show The Colgate Comedy Hour The David Frost Show The Dinah Shore Chevy Show Documentary Now! Evening at Pops The Flip Wilson Show In Living Color Late Night with Jimmy Fallon The Sonny & Cher Comedy Hour Toast of the Town The Tonight Show Starring Jimmy Fallon Tracey Takes On...2 nominations
 The Arsenio Hall Show At Home with Amy Sedaris The Benny Hill Show The Chris Rock Show Conan The Danny Kaye Show The Dinah Shore Show Great Performances Here's Edie The Hollywood Palace I Love You, America with Sarah Silverman Inside Amy Schumer The Jack Benny Program Key & Peele Tonight Starring Jack Paar The Judy Garland Show Omnibus The Red Skelton Hour SCTV Network The Steve Allen Show Tracey Ullman's Show''

Notes

References

Variety
Awards established in 1951
Awards disestablished in 2014